Gary E Sukeforth (born 1960) is an American politician and businessperson from Maine. Sukeforth is a former unenrolled (independent) member of the Maine House of Representatives from Appleton, Maine in Knox County. He is the owner of the Common Market grocery store in Union, Maine. He served a two-year term in the House of Representatives from 2002 to 2004 while a resident of Union.

Sukeforth characterizes himself as fiscally conservative and socially moderate. He said in a 2014 candidate questionnaire that he supports marijuana legalization and the expansion of workfare in Maine.

Sukeforth is a 1978 graduate of Camden-Rockport High School. He graduated from the University of Maine in 1983 with a B.S. in Agricultural & Resource Economics. He also attended Pennsylvania State University for graduate school from 1983 to 1985. He is divorced with no children.

References

1960 births
Living people
People from Knox County, Maine
Members of the Maine House of Representatives
Businesspeople from Maine
Maine Independents
University of Maine alumni
Pennsylvania State University alumni
21st-century American politicians
People from Union, Maine